Armendarits is a commune in the Pyrénées-Atlantiques department in the Nouvelle-Aquitaine region of south-western France.

The inhabitants of the commune are known as Armendariztar in Basque.

Geography
Amendarits is located some 12 km south-west of Saint-Palais and some 8 km north-east of Irissarry and is in the former province of Lower Navarre. Access to the commune is by road D300 from Iholdy in the south to the village. The D8 going east from Iholdy also passes through the southern part of the commune. The D245 from Hélette in the west passes through the commune and the village and continues north to join the D14 just south-east of Méharin. There is also the D408 which links the village to the D8 road inside the commune. Apart from a few patches of forest the commune is entirely farmland.

Numerous streams rise in the commune: the Erreka Handia and its tributaries flows north past the village, the Iharte also flows north to the east of the village, and the Ossinako Erreka forms part of the south-western border as it flows south.

Places and Hamlets

 Aguerréa
 Aïntziondoa
 Albinoritzéko Borda (2 toponyms)
 Albinoritzia
 Altchia
 Alziéta
 Ameztoya
 Arbéletchia
 Armandegia
 Baratchartéa
 Barnetchia
 Bazterrechia
 Behamendy
 Béhitia
 Bidondoa
 Bigégaïnéa
 Bistaberry
 Bordaberria
 Bordaberriko Borda
 Bordamaria
 Bordécharria
 Bourdinateguia
 Carrica
 Céhabia
 Chichabalé
 Chimounénéa
 Chingolaénéa
 Chocohonia
 Curutzétako Borda
 Donamaria
 Donapétria
 Donapétriko Borda
 Donamaria
 Donastéya
 Elhina
 Elinume
 Elizabéhéréko Borda
 Elizatchéko Borda
 Errékartéa
 Etchartéa
 Etchebarne
 Etchébazterréa
 Etchégoïnberria
 Etchégoïnberriko Borda
 Etchégorria
 Etchénika
 Etchéparéa
 Eyhérabidé
 Eyhéraldéa
 Eyhéramounoa
 Fermindéguia
 Ferminéko Borda
 Gaïneko-Etchebarnéa
 Gaïneko-Meharu
 Garatéa
 Garatéko Borda
 Haramburua
 Harizhanditéguia
 Hatsandigaraia
 Iparréa
 Iribarnéa
 Irigaraya
 Ithurburua
 Ithurburuko Borda
 Jauregia
 Jauréguicharria
 Landetxeberri
 Larraldéa
 Larramendia
 Lazalen Borda
 Legartoa
 Lekunberria
 Marihanditéguia
 Mehatzia
 Mendihilia
 Mendiondo
 Mendirigaraya
 Olhanéko Borda
 Olharanéa
 Orgalitegia
 Ossina
 Oyhanburua
 Oyhénartéa
 Pékoborda
 Pochulua
 Salla
 Sallaberria
 Sallaberriko Borda
 Sallagoitinéa
 Sorhoéta
 Sorogaraia or Sorhogaraya
 Suhartéko Borda
 Teïleria
 Uhaldea
 Uhartéa
 Urrutia
 Urritiko Borda
 Zedarria

Toponymy
The commune name in Basque is Armendaritze.

The following table details the origins of the commune name and other names in the commune.

Sources:
Orpustan: Jean-Baptiste Orpustan,  New Basque Toponymy
Raymond: Topographic Dictionary of the Department of Basses-Pyrenees, 1863, on the page numbers indicated in the table. 

Origins:
Bayonne: Cartulary of Bayonne or Livre d'Or (Book of Gold)
Duchesne: Duchesne collection volume CXIV
Chapter: Titles of the Chapter of Bayonne

History
Paul Raymond noted on page 10 of his 1863 dictionary that Armendarits was a former Barony, vassal of the Kingdom of Navarre.

Heraldry

Administration

List of Successive Mayors

Inter-communality 
Armendarits is part of seven inter-communal structures:
 the Communauté d'agglomération du Pays Basque;
 the AEP association of Arberoue;
 the Energy association of Pyrénées-Atlantiques;
 the inter-communal association for school transport and educational grouping of Méharin and Armendarits;
 the inter-communal association for development and management of the slaughterhouse at Saint-Jean-Pied-de-Port;
 the joint association Garbiki;
 the association to support Basque culture.

Demography
In 2017 the commune had 405 inhabitants.

Economy
Economic activity is mainly agricultural. The commune is part of the Appellation d'origine contrôlée (AOC) zone of Ossau-iraty.

Culture and Heritage

Civil Heritage
Several buildings and sites in the commune are registered as historical monuments:
The Jauregia Manor (17th century)
The Urrutia Farmhouse (1636)
The Uhaldea Farmhouse (1780)
The Sorogaraia Farmhouse (1602)
Houses and Farms (17th-19th century)

Other sites of interest
A protohistoric fortified place (a gaztelu zahar) at Elhina.

Houses in Armendarits Picture Gallery

Religious Heritage

The Parish Church of Saint Peter (17th century). Its cemetery contains many Hilarri:

Hilarri Picture Gallery

Facilities

Education
The commune has a primary school.

Notable people linked to the commune
Bernard Renau d'Eliçagaray (Eñaut d'Elizagarai), called little Renau, born in 1652 at Armendarits and died in 1719, was a mathematician, Inspector General of the Navy, in 1689 author of the Theory of Operation of Vessels. He was especially famous for his Bomb vessels. The pastoral of Soule in 2007 (at Camou-Cihigue) was dedicated to him.

See also
Communes of the Pyrénées-Atlantiques department

References

External links
Armendarits on Géoportail, National Geographic Institute (IGN) website 
Armendaritz on the 1750 Cassini Map

Communes of Pyrénées-Atlantiques
Lower Navarre